The Thor-Ablestar, or Thor-Able-Star, also known as Thor-Epsilon  was an early American expendable launch system consisting of a PGM-17 Thor missile, with an Ablestar upper stage. It was a member of the Thor family of rockets, and was derived from the Thor-Able.

The Ablestar second stage was an enlarged version of the Able, which gave the Thor-Ablestar a greater payload capacity compared to the Thor-Able. It also incorporated restart capabilities, allowing a multiple-burn trajectory to be flown, further increasing payload, or allowing the rocket to reach different orbits. It was the first rocket to be developed with such a capability and development of the stage took a mere eight months.

Nineteen Thor-Ablestar were launched between 1960–1965, of which four failed, and a fifth resulted in a partial failure, as only one of two payloads separated from the upper stage.

The first failure was the launch of Courier 1A, an experimental communications satellite, on 19 August 1960 when the first stage shut down 30 seconds earlier than planned and was destroyed by the Range Safety officer. On 30 November, another launch involving a Transit satellite failed in practically identical fashion. This episode nearly created an international incident as parts of the Thor landed in Cuba. War was threatened. Cuban leader Fidel Castro subsequently sold off the Thor's engine to the Soviets and the Chinese received its thrust vectors, which ended up proving valuable to the latter's development of a ballistic missile capability. To prevent this from happening again, future Thor Ablestar launches had their flight paths modified to avoid passing over Cuba.

The launch of a Transit satellite on 22 February 1961 was successful, but its companion Lofti satellite failed to separate from the second stage.

On 29 June 1961, a Thor-Ablestar successfully inserted a Transit-4A into orbit, but two hours later the Ablestar exploded for unknown reasons into hundreds of pieces, which remained in orbit. This is the first known artificial object to break up unintentionally in space.

The third launch failure occurred on 24 January 1962 when the second stage produced insufficient thrust to achieve orbital velocity for several piggybacked satellites. The fourth and final failure was the launch of an Anna geodetic satellite on 10 May 1962 when the second stage completely failed to ignite.

Two versions were built; the Thor-Ablestar 1, with a DM-21 Thor, and an AJ-10-104 second stage engine, and the Thor-Ablestar 2, which had a DSV-2A Thor first stage, and an uprated AJ-10-104D engine on the second stage. Thor-Ablestar 1 launches occurred from LC-17 at Cape Canaveral, and Thor-Ablestar 2 rockets were launched from LC-75-1 at Vandenberg Space Force Base and is now designated SLC-2.

See also
List of Thor and Delta launches (1960–1969)

References

Thor (rocket family)
Spacecraft that broke apart in space